Paul William Woods (born April 12, 1955) is a Canadian former professional ice hockey player who played for the Detroit Red Wings of the National Hockey League (NHL) from 1977 through 1984.  

Woods has been the color commentator for Detroit Red Wings radio broadcasts since the 1987-1988 season.

Career
Woods was born in Hespeler, Ontario. As a youth, he played in the 1966 Quebec International Pee-Wee Hockey Tournament with a minor ice hockey team from Hespeler. Woods spent his junior career with the Sault Ste. Marie Greyhounds, leading the team in scoring in 1974-75 with 121 points in 62 games. He was drafted in the 3rd round (51st overall) of the 1975 NHL Entry Draft by the Montreal Canadiens. Woods won two AHL Calder Cup titles with Montreal's farm team, the Nova Scotia Voyageurs in 1975–76 and 1976–77, scoring the Cup winning goal in 1976. After two seasons in Nova Scotia, he was claimed by Detroit in the 1977 NHL Waiver Draft. His entire NHL career would be spent with Detroit.

Woods was the youngest captain in team history prior to Steve Yzerman. He scored 19 goals in his rookie season and settled into a role as a defensive forward, shutting down the opposition's top players. This was a role he embraced, and Woods' work ethic and speed made him a fan favorite in Detroit. His career was shortened due to a hip injury, finishing his NHL career with 72 goals and 124 assists in 502 games played.

Woods finished his pro career with the AHL's Adirondack Red Wings in 1984–85.

In 1987, Woods began a career as the color commentator for the Detroit Red Wings radio broadcasts. On October 17, 2022, he called his 3,000th game. He is the longest-serving radio color commentator in Detroit sports history.

Career statistics

Regular season and playoffs

International

References

External links
 

1955 births
Living people
Adirondack Red Wings players
Canadian sports announcers
Detroit Red Wings announcers
Detroit Red Wings captains
Detroit Red Wings players
Ice hockey people from Ontario
Montreal Canadiens draft picks
National Hockey League broadcasters
Nova Scotia Voyageurs players
Sault Ste. Marie Greyhounds players
Sportspeople from Cambridge, Ontario
Toronto Toros draft picks
Canadian ice hockey left wingers